Yoo Hae-jung (born October 9, 2000) is a South Korean actress.

Filmography

Television series

Film

Awards and nominations

References

External links
 
 
 

2000 births
Living people
South Korean television actresses
South Korean film actresses
South Korean child actresses